New Generation may refer to:

 "New Generation", single from the album Dog Man Star by Suede
 New Generation (Malayalam film movement)
 New Generation Mobile, Italian mobile phone manufacturer
 New Generation Pictures, visual media production company
 New Generation Software, defunct video game company
 New Generation University College in Ethiopia
 New Generation Wrestling, British professional wrestling promotion
 Politics
 The term "new generation" (of African leaders), buzzword used to express optimism in a new generation of African leadership
 New Generation Party, political party in Costa Rica
 New Generation Party, a nationalist political party in Romania
 New Generation Movement, an Iraqi Kurdish political party

See also 
 "The Choice of a New Generation", a 1984 slogan as part of the Pepsi Generation ad campaign
 New Generation Party (disambiguation)
 Newgen (disambiguation)
 Next Generation (disambiguation)
 New Generation Rollingstock, class of Queensland Rail electric multiple units
 Amityville: A New Generation, 1993 American supernatural horror film
 Death Note: New Generation, Japanese live-action web miniseries based on manga series Death Note
 Street Fighter III: New Generation, a video game of the Street Fighter series 
 New Generation Currency Series